The Union of Evangelical Churches (German: Union Evangelischer Kirchen, UEK) is an organisation of 13 United and Reformed evangelical churches in Germany, which are all member churches of the Evangelical Church in Germany.

Member churches in the UEK 
 Evangelical State Church of Anhalt 
 Evangelical State Church in Baden
 Evangelical Church of Berlin-Brandenburg-Silesian Upper Lusatia (EKBO)
 Evangelical Church of Bremen (BEK)
 Evangelical Church of Hesse Electorate-Waldeck (EKKW)
 Evangelical Church in Hesse and Nassau (EKHN)
 Church of Lippe 
 Evangelical Church in Middle Germany
 Evangelical Church of the Palatinate 
 Evangelical Reformed Church (regional church) 
 Evangelical Church in the Rhineland 
 Evangelical Church of Westphalia

Guests are
 Evangelical Lutheran Church in Northern Germany
 Evangelical Lutheran Church in Oldenburg
 Reformierter Bund
 Evangelical Church in Württemberg

History 
The UEK was founded on July 1, 2003. The organisation succeeded the former organisation Evangelical Church of the Union (EKU). The seat of the organisation used to be Berlin. For structural reasons, it was moved to the seat of the Evangelical Church in Germany (EKD) in Hanover though.
On November 9, 2019, Union of Evangelical Churches allowed blessings of same-sex marriages.

Structure 
The parliament (=Vollkonferenz) of the organisation is an elected group of 47 members, which are elected for six years each term. The 47 members elect a "Präsidium".

References

External links 
 

United and uniting churches
Evangelical Church in Germany
Protestant denominations established in the 21st century